Dialommus macrocephalus, the Foureye rockskipper, is a species of labrisomid blenny native to the eastern Pacific Ocean from Baja California, Mexico to Colombia.  It inhabits the intertidal zone and is capable of leaving the water in search of land-dwelling prey.  It feeds on invertebrates including crabs.  This species can reach a length of  TL.

References

macrocephalus
Fish described in 1861
Taxa named by Albert Günther